Petalium is a genus of beetles in the family Ptinidae.

List of species
These 28 species belong to the genus Petalium:

 Petalium alaseriatum Ford, 1973 i c g b
 Petalium alternatum Ford, 1973 i c g b
 Petalium antillarum Pic, 1903 g
 Petalium arizonense Fall, 1905 i c g
 Petalium bicolor Fall, 1905 i c g
 Petalium bistriatum (Say, 1825) i c g b
 Petalium brevisetum Ford, 1973 i c g
 Petalium californicum Fall, 1905 i c g b
 Petalium debile Fall, 1905 i c g b
 Petalium debilitatum Ford, 1973 i c g
 Petalium demicarinatum Ford, 1973 i c g
 Petalium evolutum Ford, 1973 i c g
 Petalium fauveli Pic, 1905 g
 Petalium fleutiauxi Lepesme, 1947 g
 Petalium globulum Ford, 1973 i c g
 Petalium grossum Ford, 1973 i c g
 Petalium incarinatum Ford, 1973 i c g
 Petalium incisum Ford, 1973 i c g b
 Petalium knulli Ford, 1973 i c g
 Petalium longulum Ford, 1973 i c g
 Petalium pici Lepesme, 1947 g
 Petalium punctatum Pic, 1911 g
 Petalium schwarzi Fall, 1905 i c g
 Petalium seriatum Fall, 1905 i c g
 Petalium uniperforatum Ford, 1973 i c g
 Petalium werneri Ford, 1973 i c g
 Petalium whitei Ford, 1973 i c g b
 Petalium yuccae Fall, 1905 i c g

Data sources: i = ITIS, c = Catalogue of Life, g = GBIF, b = Bugguide.net

References

 BioLib.cz

 
Ptinidae